Albanifriedhof is a cemetery in Göttingen, Germany just outside the city wall to the southeast. It is most famous as the final resting place of Carl Friedrich Gauss.The cemetery is named after St. Albani Evangelical Lutheran Church in Göttingen.

Notable interments
 Johann Carl Friedrich Gauss (1777–1855), mathematician and scientist
 Johann Friedrich Gmelin (1748–1804), naturalist, botanist, entomologist and malacologist
 Johann Friedrich Herbart (1776–1841), philosopher, psychologist, and founder of pedagogy as an academic discipline
 Otto Jahn (1813–1869), archaeologist, philologist, and writer on art and music
 Rudolf Hermann Lotze (1817–1881),  philosopher and logician

External links 
 

Cemeteries in Germany
Lutheran cemeteries
Göttingen
Protected areas of Lower Saxony
Buildings and structures in Göttingen (district)
Lutheran cemeteries in Germany